Rebecca Elizabeth Smart (born 30 January 1976) is an Australian actress, who began acting for television at the age of eight. Her first movie role was one year later in The Coca-Cola Kid. She played the lead in the 1988 film Celia and went on to do many more supporting roles in movies and television shows, including miniseries and soap operas. Smart has worked with Australian directors of film, television and theatre. Companies include Sydney Theatre Company and Belvoir St Theatre.

Early life and education
Smart was born in Tamworth, New South Wales, and was educated at St Catherine's School, Waverley, an independent, Anglican, day and boarding school for girls, located in the eastern suburbs of Sydney.

Awards and nominations 
Smart won the Most Popular Actress in a Miniseries/Telemovie Silver Logie at the Logie Awards for her performance in the 1987 Australian 
Miniseries The Shiralee.  She was also nominated for Best Supporting Actress at the Australian Film Institute Awards and the Film Critics Circle of Australia Awards for her performance in Blackrock.

Filmography

Filmography

FILM

Television

TELEVISION

References

1976 births
Australian child actresses
Australian film actresses
Australian television actresses
Living people
Logie Award winners
People from Tamworth, New South Wales